Rosella was launched in Newcastle upon Tyne in 1825 and was wrecked on 7 December 1825.

She first appeared in the Register of Shipping (RS) for 1826 with T.Hall, master, Noble, owner, and trade Newcastle. According to the Sound Toll Register the name of Rosellas master was Robert Hall.

Rosella sailed for the Baltic and was reported to have been arrived at Dantzig on 17 October from Copenhagen. Severns crew had abandoned her on 28 November after she had become waterlogged; one man had been lost.

On 7 December Roselle, Robert Hall, master, was driven ashore and wrecked on Bornholm, Denmark. Rosella was on the return leg of her maiden voyage, from Danzig to Newcastle upon Tyne. LL reported on 3 January 1826 that the crew and materials had been saved. Furthermore, part of the cargo was expected to be saved.

In late 1825 or early 1826, Armstrong, master rescued part of Rosellas crew and the members ofSeverns crew aboard Rosella. Emperor Alexander had great difficulty rescuing the crews, having to use ropes to haul them individually to shore over the rocks. She rescued eight members of Rosellas crew; the other 12 chose to remain on Bornholm to take care of the wreck and to await another vessel that might bring them home. Off Flamborough Head, Emperor Alexander encountered the brig Henry and William, of Aberdeen, Allan, master and transferred the rescued men to her. Henry and William delivered them to Aberdeen on 17 January 1826.

Citations

1825 ships
Age of Sail merchant ships of England
Maritime incidents in December 1825